Robert Bruce Whatman (born 29 January 1951) is a former Australian rules footballer who played for Geelong in the Victorian Football League (now known as the Australian Football League).

Whatman is best remembered for a game against Collingwood at Kardinia Park in August 1972. He was one of the two reserves for Geelong, who were 31 points behind at three-quarter time. Whatman came off the bench and helped spark a dramatic Geelong revival, kicking 3 goals 2 behinds in the last quarter, with Geelong kicking 7 goals 3 behinds to Collingwood's 2 goals 2 behinds and winning the game by a solitary point.

References

External links
 
 

1951 births
Living people
Geelong Football Club players
Manuka Football Club players
Australian rules footballers from the Australian Capital Territory